Lawrence Nduga (born 22 December 1995) is a Ugandan football striker who currently plays for Orapa United F.C.

References

1995 births
Living people
Ugandan footballers
Ugandan expatriates in Burundi
Kiira Young FC players
Simba FC players
Bright Stars FC players
Bul FC players
Nkwazi F.C. players
Sharps Shooting Stars FC players
Orapa United F.C. players
Association football forwards
Uganda international footballers
Ugandan expatriate footballers
Expatriate footballers in Northern Cyprus
Ugandan expatriate sportspeople in Northern Cyprus
Expatriate footballers in Zambia
Ugandan expatriate sportspeople in Zambia
Expatriate footballers in Botswana
Ugandan expatriate sportspeople in Botswana
Sportspeople from Kampala